The Nassauvieae are a tribe of flowering plants in the family Asteraceae.

Genera

 Acourtia D.Don (65 spp.)
 Ameghinoa Speg.
 Berylsimpsonia B. L. Turner
 Burkartia Crisci (one sp.)
 Calopappus Meyen
 Calorezia Panero
 Cephalopappus Nees & Mart.
 Criscia Katinas (one sp.)
 Dolichlasium Lag.
 Holocheilus Cass. (seven spp.)
 Jungia L. f.
 Leucheria Lag.
 Leunisia Phil.
 Lophopappus Rusby
 Macrachaenium Hook f. (one sp.)
 Marticorenia Crisci (one sp.)
 Moscharia Ruiz & Pav.
 Nassauvia Comm. ex Juss.
 Oxyphyllum Phil.
 Pamphalea Lag. (9 spp.)
 Perezia Lag.
 Pleocarphus D.Don: (one sp.)
 Polyachyrus Lag.
 Proustia Lag.
 Triptilion Ruiz & Pav.
 Trixis P.Br. (50 spp.)

References

External links

 
Asteraceae tribes